The Jon Spencer Blues Explosion was an American three-piece rock band from New York City, formed in 1991. The group consisted of Judah Bauer on guitar, backing vocals, harmonica and occasional lead vocals, Russell Simins on drums and Jon Spencer on vocals, guitar and theremin. Their musical style is largely rooted in rock and roll although it draws influences from punk, blues, garage, rockabilly, soul, noise rock, rhythm and blues and hip hop. They released nine official studio albums, collaborative records with Dub Narcotic Sound System and R.L. Burnside as well as numerous live, singles, out-take albums, compilations, remix albums and, in 2010, a series of expanded reissues. Throughout the course of their career, this experimental sound and occasionally unconventional recording techniques has allowed the band to work with such artists as Elliott Smith, Beck, Solomon Burke, Steve Albini, Martina Topley-Bird and Ad Rock of the Beastie Boys.

History

Formation
Originally from Hanover, New Hampshire, United States, Jon Spencer attended Brown University in Providence, Rhode Island where he was part of the noise rock band Shithaus, with Tod Ashley (Cop Shoot Cop, Firewater), before moving to Washington, D.C. in 1985 where he formed the band Pussy Galore with  Julia Cafritz, relocating to New York in May 1986. Spencer played and recorded with Gibson Bros., Boss Hog and The Honeymoon Killers prior to the formation of the Blues Explosion.

Judah Bauer, from Appleton, Wisconsin, had been in an early line-up of The Spitters, and with Russell Simins, from Queens, New York, recorded as part of Crowbar Massage.

It was with Jerry Teel's Honeymoon Killers that Bauer, Simins and Spencer would all perform and record and from which they would go on to form The Jon Spencer Blues Explosion.

"Russell and I would rehearse with Honeymoon Killers and the rehearsal would be over and Russell and I would keep playing, eventually inviting Simins' friend Bauer to join in." 

The sound of The Jon Spencer Blues Explosion was informed by previous bands with influence taken from working with the Gibson Bros. which was already evident in the last Pussy Galore album. "That final Pussy Galore album exuded a very Gibson Brothers-bent version of what was to come with Spencer's next, more successful venture the Jon Spencer Blues Explosion."

 "...after five years of Pussy Galore I was able to connect to rock ’n’ roll in some way that I wasn't able to before," he remembers those formative days. "I was pissed off about a lot of things...so much shitty rock ’n’ roll that angered me, and Pussy Galore was kicking against that. With the Blues Explosion, there was some of that, but now I was into celebrating it." – Jon Spencer 

They were signed to the large independent label Matador Records between 1993 and 2002 in the US, Crypt Records between 1992 and 1994 in Germany and Mute Records between 1996 and 2005 in the UK although they have released material on a number of different labels including the 2010 reissues on Shout Factory in the US and Shove Records in the UK.

A Reverse Willie Horton / The Jon Spencer Blues Explosion / Crypt Style (1991–1992)
The band had been playing together for six months when they had their first recording session with Kramer at Noise NY, New York in July 1991 and recorded fourteen songs over the course of three hours, "only doing second takes here and there, we didn't even go to the mixing board". This session was issued in its entirety as the first album by The Jon Spencer Blues Explosion, A Reverse Willie Horton. This was an unofficial album issued by "Pubic Pop Can", at some point between late 1991 and early 1992, in an edition of 500 or 1000 copies (the figure varies between sources). It has been suggested that the source of the bootleg was a dubbed copy of a cassette that Jon Spencer let somebody copy during a tour with the Gibson Bros. in August 1991.

The front cover image on the album is a negative of Clarence Thomas, his wife, and George Bush at Thomas' swearing in ceremony for the Supreme Court on October 19, 1991, with the title and artist written in a typewriter style font. The rear sleeve features hand-written titles and label information over the top of a photograph of a topless woman. Both front and rear artwork are pasted onto a plain black sleeve. The title refers to the convicted felon William R. Horton who was used extensively for political advertisements during the 1988 presidential campaign.

The second session was recorded by Steve Albini at the Waterfront, Hoboken, NJ in November/December 1991. Tracks from both the Kramer and Albini sessions were then officially issued on the Caroline (US) / Hut (UK) release The Jon Spencer Blues Explosion; in larger amounts by Crypt Records as Crypt Style; and in an alternate version of Crypt Style by 1 + 2 Records (Japan), including the track "Colty" which was unavailable elsewhere until the 2010 Shout! Factory release of Year One which compiled every released track from both sessions with the exception of an alternate take of "Feeling of Love" (released on Dirty Shirt Rock N Roll: The First Ten Years).

The band made a music video for the song "Rachel" directed by Jim Spring and Jens Jurgensen which was later issued by Matador Records on the 1997 Live Promo Video.

The first album by The Jon Spencer Blues Explosion was the only one to be issued by Caroline Records.

"In 1992, The Jon Spencer Blues Explosion inked a deal with Caroline Records and requested a very specific signing bonus-- the then-new 10xCD Jerry Lee Lewis box set. As band lore has it, Caroline never sprang for the set, and the Blues Explosion's tenure there was short-lived and acrimonious."

The first single release was "Shirt Jac" on In The Red Records (1992) also from the second recording session with Steve Albini. This was the first of the Explosion Juke Box Series singles inspired by "a similar series of Charlie Feathers released in the 70s" (the third single in the series, "Get With It", was actually an arrangement of a Feathers single from 1956).

The b-side "Latch On" is a Jon Spencer arrangement of a rockabilly song despite the fact that The Jon Spencer Blues Explosion recording has very little in common with the most well-known recordings of this track (released by Ron Hargrave and The Cochran Brothers). The Jon Spencer Blues Explosion version is more than likely a cover of the Cochran Brothers version of this song as both tracks feature the words "you are really gone" which do not appear in the lyrics sung by Ron Hargrave.

Extra Width (1993–1994)
When the band signed with Matador Records they "asked for the 9xCD Stax-Volt Complete Singles 1959–1968...Matador made good with Stax, and the band enjoyed a decade-long partnership with the label".

In late 1992 Jon Spencer Blues Explosion embarked on a long tour in the US supporting the Jesus Lizard. Frank Kozik designed posters for shows at Emo's, Austin, Texas and Kennel Club, San Francisco.

Recording sessions for the Extra Width, The Jon Spencer Blues Explosion's second studio album, took place in Memphis at Doug Easleys studio on November 23/24 and December 3, 1992 during the Jesus Lizard tour and at Waterworks Recording in New York with Jim Waters where all further overdubs and mixing was done. The album graphic design copies a package of panty hose purchased in Memphis, Tennessee. The original panty hose packaging can be seen in a band photo used on Mo' Width and the later reissues of Extra Width.

It is said that during this time Jon Spencer's stage persona evolved and he established what is now synonymous with a Blues Explosion live performance.

"Jon had a breakthrough. It was time and art. He got better at it. The James Brown-style show was an old method, but Jon brought it to another level. Before that, it was punk – he was into it, but he was coy. he finally crossed over and became a full-fledged performer. He wanted to be watched."

"Spencer writhes about, possessed by Presley during the amazing "Vacuum of Loneliness" – his tortured soul dragged over shards o' glass for all to see. The wailin' theremin spits out sound and adds to the cathartic confusion. If this is real and not theatre, I'm disturbed." 

Extra Width was released in June 1993. "Afro" was later released as a 7" only single in the UK in 1994 and had a music video directed by Tom Surgal. This was the only single to be released from the album and featured b-side "Relax-Her" which is labelled as "Incidental" on the test pressing and introduced as such on the recording.

On September 11, 1993 The Jon Spencer Blues Explosion appeared at Blast First event The Lost Weekend at London Astoria 2 with The Afghan Whigs, God Machine and Hair & Skin Trading Company. The accompanying Lost Weekend compilation album was limited to 3000 copies and included the song "Afro". 2000 copies were given to attendees of the two-day event and the remaining 1000 were sold via (now defunct) UK music weekly Melody Maker for £1.50 each.

Their first TV appearance was on Channel 4 UK TV show The Word (Season 4, Episode 12) in February 1994, performing "Afro" and "History of Sex". Afterwards presenter Mark Lamarr said "they're the best live band I've ever seen."

Also in early 1994 In The Red Records released "Train No. 3" and "Train No. 1" as the third installment of the Explosion Juke Box Series ("Train No. 2" appeared Extra Width).

Mo' Width was issued in July 1994 by Au Go Go Records and made-up of out-takes from the Extra Width-era featuring covers of "There Stands The Glass" (Webb Pierce), "Beat of The Traps" (Teri Rodd & MSR Singers) and Ole Man Trouble (Otis Redding), an alternate mix of "Afro" with a much more prominent organ solo and "Rob K" features Rob Kennedy from The Workdogs and the song was later titled "Rob K is President" on the Mute Records 2000 reissue.

During an interview with Dutch magazine Oor Jon Spencer said that the release of Mo' Width was delayed until two months before the release as the next studio album.

Orange (1994–1995)
Orange was recorded at Waterworks, NYC with Jim Waters and released in October 1994. The original vinyl Matador Records was as a silver-coloured picture disc and first issue of the Crypt Records edition had orange-coloured sleeves rather than the usual silver.

"Bellbottoms" opens the album and features a string section arrangement by Kurt Hoffman. The song was also issued by Matador Records as a white vinyl 7" only single in the UK and had a music video directed by Tom Surgal. There were also music videos for "Dang" directed by Steve Hanft, "Flavor"
directed by Evan Bernard and featuring appearances by Beck (who also appears on the song) and Mike D of the Beastie Boys.

In August 1994 The Jon Spencer Blues Explosion played a number of tour dates in Australia and New Zealand with Beck and in September 1994 they played in the Netherlands at Vera, Groningen on the 18th and recorded a live set for VPRO radio on the 25th. The VPRO session was issued as an unofficial 10" bootleg which included otherwise unreleased songs "Curfew Blues" and "Wriggle and Move" and the "Intro" is edited together in the same way as "Tour Diary" on Experimental Remixes and at least two segments appear on both releases. "Curfew Blues" was later released on Jukebox Explosion Rockin' Mid-90s Punkers and the 2010 reissue of Orange includes two VPRO session tracks "Very Rare" and "Woman Love" (title sometimes given as "Frustrate").

In October 1994 the Blues Explosion made their first attempt to record a live album at DPC, Tucson, Arizona, US but the performance was plagued with technical problems and was stopped when an audience member threw a stink bomb. Some of the songs were later released on the 2010 reissue of Controversial Negro.

In December 1994 they performed live on The Jon Stewart TV Show at MTV Studios, New York City. "Get With It" from this show was released on the 1997 Live Promo Video by Matador Records.

The Jon Spencer Blues Explosion played UK shows in March 1995 with the Beastie Boys (including Brixton Academy, London where they would headline in April 2002 on the Plastic Fang tour) and in May they toured the US with The Roots and Beastie Boys.

Experimental Remixes EP was released in May 1995 featuring various tracks from Orange reworked by artists including UNKLE, Beck, Mario Caldato Jr., Mike D, Dub Narcotic Sound System, Moby and GZA (featuring Killah Priest).

By September 1996 Orange had sold 70,000 copies.

In 2000 Experimental Remixes was reissued with new remixes on CD and double vinyl and Orange was reissued on CD with an enhanced section featuring "Dang", "Flavor" and "Bellbottoms" music videos and on the vinyl edition was packaged with a poster. The album was reissued again in 2010 by Shout! Factory (US) / Shove Records (UK) as a double CD set this time combining Orange, Experimental Remixes and several rare, live and previously unreleased tracks.

Now I Got Worry (1996–1997)
On the afternoon of February 6, 1996, the Jon Spencer Blues Explosion recorded the album A Ass Pocket of Whiskey with R.L. Burnside and Kenny Brown at Lunati Farms in Holly Springs, Mississippi. A further two tracks, "Alice Mae" and "Highway 7", also recorded at Lunati Farms in February 1996, would be released on the 1997 R.L. Burnside album Mr Wizard. Both albums featured cover artwork by Derek Hess.

The musical arrangements used on the tracks "2 Brothers" and "Tojo Told Hitler" from A Ass Pocket of Whiskey would evolve into The Jon Spencer Blues Explosion song "Cool Vee" which was released as a b-side to "2Kindsa Love". "Have You Ever Been Lonely?" is a jam based on "Vacuum of Loneliness" originally released on the 1992 self-titled album.

"It was pretty intimidating to go down [to Mississippi] and record with R.L. since he's such an idol of mine," says Spencer, who toured with the guitarist/singer in 1995. "You definitely get the feeling you're playing for him, rather than with him. It was pretty much the same with Rufus Thomas."

Now I Got Worry was produced by Jon Spencer and Jim Waters and recorded at Easley Studio, Memphis; G-Son, Los Angeles; and Waterworks West, Tucson. These sessions were mostly between February 5 and 13, 1996 (the same time as the recording with R.L. Burnside). The album was released by Matador Records and Mute Records in October 1996 (reaching number 50 in the UK album chart) and features appearances by Thermos Malling of Doo Rag (credited with "Bang" on "2Kindsa Love"), Rufus Thomas and Money Mark and a cover version of "Fuck Shit Up" originally by Dub Narcotic Sound System with Judah Bauer on lead vocals. The Korean edition did not include "Fuck Shit Up" and the Japanese release featured "Get With It" and "Cool Vee" as bonus tracks.

During this time Matador releases were distributed by Capitol in an article about this Marc Burton, buyer for Minneapolis’ Electric Fetus, said "I think with the extra exposure he’ll get through wider distribution, Spencer could hit as big as Beck did."

Capitol / Matador released a promo-only 7” single of five different radio promo spots.

R.L. Burnside would also join The Jon Spencer Blues Explosion for the Now I Got Worry tour dates in the UK, Europe and the US in October and November 1996. On October 23, 1996 Lola da Musica, VPRO TV filmed both artists in a pre-show jam session at De Melkweg, Amsterdam. "Boogie Chillun" was later released officially on the Live Promo Video.

On October 29 The Jon Spencer Blues Explosion recorded a short live set for MTV Studios, London consisting of Now I Got Worry songs and "Water Main" and "Vacuum of Loneliness". "Love All of Me" and the band introduction were officially released on the Live Promo Video.

"2Kindsa Love" was the first UK single released from Now I Got Worry by Mute Records issued on pink vinyl 7" and CD in November 1996 with music video directed by Mike Mills it reached 122 in the UK charts.

"Wail" was released in the UK by Mute Records on May 10, 1997 as a CD and two 7" singles (grey and green vinyl). The incorrectly-spelled "John Spencer Blues Explosion" cover artwork was written in Tipp-Ex on an escalator hand-rail at Tottenham Court Road underground station in London (there was also a second part a bit further down the which just said "Damn"). Each of the covers features a slightly different photo by William Bankhead of the same text.

The music video for "Wail" was directed by Weird Al Yankovic, reaching number 66 in the UK singles chart.

In Melbourne, Australia, on September 6, 1997 The Jon Spencer Blues Explosion performed "2Kindsa Love" / "Flavor" on ABC's national, weekly morning youth program, Recovery. Jon Spencer can be seen running through the audience, around the set and destroying the "Blues Explosion" back drop. Jon Spencer was asked about this particular performance in a June 2010 issue of the UK music weekly NME:
"Which song were you playing with Jon Spencer Blues Explosion when you trashed a TV studio in Melbourne in '97?"
"We may have started with another song and went into 'Flavour'. It wasn't planned, it just kinda hit me. It may have just been exhaustion. You reach a point on tour and you get a bit punch-drunk. That show is broadcast live in the morning! They were all really nice about it though!" 

In 2010 a new version of this album was released by Shout! Factory / Shove! Records expanded to include b-sides, rare tracks and the previously unreleased "Roosevelt Hotel Blues" featuring Beck and Money Mark.

In May 1997 Controversial Negro was released. This was a promotional only live album issued on vinyl in the US, CD in the UK and it was officially released in Japan on CD with five additional tracks.

The sleeve for this release is referred to in an article titled "Mo' bitter blues" originally published in May 1997:

To the casual observer The Jon Spencer Blues Explosion may seem like little more than surly, self-important nihilists with an all-encompassing persecution complex. Yet their studious reserve in the face of journalistic interrogation is hardly surprising when you consider that the staunch traditionalists of the American rock media have recently branded them as racists, simply because they've dared to treat the blues as something other than a sacred museum piece. A situation soon to be exacerbated by the band's forthcoming promo live album, rather incautiously titled 'Controversial Negro' and garishly illustrated with a day-glo Warhol print of Mick Jagger's iconic countenance. Ultimately, Jon Spencer is playing with fire. He's gleefully taunting the inverse-racists of so-called liberal America with incendiary images. He is, after all, a graduate of semiotics (the brand of linguistics concerned with signs and symbols), so he knows exactly what he's doing.

Controversial Negro works on two distinct levels: firstly it's a timely reminder to the journalistic 'squares' of far simpler times, when Jagger and his Rolling Stones (now untouchable old-guard stalwarts) were similarly decried for 'bastardizing the blues'; secondly, it's a forceful visual communiqué that The Jon Spencer Blues Explosion staunchly refuse to be intimidated into artistic compromise.

The title for this album comes from the Public Enemy song "Burn Hollywood Burn" from their 1990 album Fear of a Black Planet. Towards the end of the track someone asks Flava Flav the following question: "Now we're considering you for a part in our new production, how do you feel about playing a controversial negro?"

The artwork used on the promotional version along with the title Controversial Negro was originally intended for Now I Got Worry.

In June 1997 they performed at the Tibetan Freedom Concert in New York City and a live version of "Blues X Man" was released on the accompanying triple CD album (which also featured Russell Simins performing with Cibo Matto).

Acme (1997–1999)
In March 1997 the band recorded a track at Dub Narcotic Studios, Olympia track for the K Records released the compilation Selector Dub Narcotic (released May 1998). The song titled "Blues Explosion Attack" name checked Calvin Johnson, Doo Rag, Subsonics, Speedball Baby, Demolition Doll Rods, R.L. Burnside, Dub Narcotic Sound System and Sleater Kinney who had supported the Blues Explosion at their Moore Theatre gig the previous day (The song would later be re-written and re-recorded for the album Acme).

Work on Acme began in October 1997, when the band entered the studio with Dan Nakamura, a.k.a. Dan the Automator for "Right Place, Wrong Time", a cover of the Dr. John hit used on the soundtrack to Scream 2.

Spencer said: "The reason we did that Scream 2 soundtrack was to try working with a producer. We were definitely into the Dr. Octagon record – it's a great record, and also a bizarre kinda record. So besides 'Right Place.' we recorded some other songs.""

The next stop was Steve Albini's studio, Electrical Audio, where the Blues Explosion cut some tracks in the days following their 1998 New Year's Eve Chicago performance. "Steve's we cut everything live, like we always do," he says. "I wanted to use Steve because I knew he would do a good job and the tapes would sound great, and we could send them to anybody because we had a great starting point and couldn't really go wrong"

Whilst in Chicago they also met Andre Williams who was playing locally. He recorded guest vocals for the track "Lapdance" (which wasn't released until the Acme Plus / Extra Acme albums issued the following year).

The singer explained: "Some of Acme was done in the old-fashioned Blues Explosion way, me working with the engineer, but we were also casting a wide net. Some songs were mixed and remixed by different producers, which is one reason it got so expensive, and some of them were eventually stitched together from two or three different mixes. We weren't being so precious about these songs, we were letting other people work on it and then we'd shuffle the deck."

Acme was released in October 1998. In the US the first single to be released from the album was "Talk About The Blues". This song was recorded during a session with Calvin Johnson at Dub Narcotic, Olympia, Washington. Most of the other tracks recorded at this time would be released in 1999 as the collaborative album Sideways Soul: Dub Narcotic Sound System Meets The Jon Spencer Blues Explosion in a Dancehall Style!.

The music video, directed by Evan Bernard, features Winona Ryder, Giovanni Ribisi and John C. Reilly as the Blues Explosion with Judah, Russell and Jon acting. The singer told MTV Online: "I think that people are really going to be surprised when they see the acting on the part of the Blues Explosion. When people get a load of some of the heavy, dramatic, really very intense scenes that we pulled out from our souls, I think people are really going to be blown away...".

Throughout the life of the band the use of the word "blues" in the band name has caused a great deal of debate. The lyrics of "Talk About The Blues" address this issue referring directly to MTV and Rolling Stone magazine and features the line "I do not play no blues, I play rock 'n' roll" (which itself was a reference to the Mississippi Fred McDowell album I Do Not Play No Rock 'n' Roll).

"Talk About The Blues" was a reaction a Rolling Stone review of Now I Got Worry and Q&A with Jon Spencer.

"I wrote the song right after we did the interview, inspired by that and also some of the criticism we’ve received over the past couple years. If we tried to record some song that was a response to criticism as it happened, that would be too heavy-handed. The lyrics stayed true to the original off-the-cuff feel, what you call a rant. But it's not such a big deal, you know. A lot of that stuff just doesn't merit a response." 

"Magical Colors" reached number 92 in the UK singles chart in November 1998. The Terry Richardson directed video is a compilation of still photographs.

"Talk About The Blues" reached number 120 in the UK singles chart in March 1999.

Non-Acme track "New Year (Destroyer)" was released as a split-single with Barry Adamson as the fourth single in the Slut Smalls series.

"Heavy" was the final single to be released from Acme in August 1999: it reached number 106 in the UK singles chart.

In 1998 they appeared on the Canal+ show Nulle Part Ailleurs performing "High Gear" and "Talk About The Blues". During the nine and a half minute performance Jon Spencer made full use of the television studio, running through the audience, standing on the desk and was carried back to the stage by one of the bemused presenters. Whilst on the desk Jon referred to and shook the hand of Jackie Chan who was given a copy of the album Acme.

On the morning of July 22, 1999, The Jon Spencer Blues Explosion tour van was broken into in the loading dock of The Sheraton in Vancouver, British Columbia, Canada. The window was smashed and a mess of gear was stolen, including mics, amps, rack equipment, and the original 1962 Vanguard Model Theremin. The theremin was never recovered.

Sideways Soul (1999–2001)
In September 1999 they released the collaborative album Sideways Soul under the name Dub Narcotic Sound System Meets The Jon Spencer Blues Explosion in a Dancehall Style. The nine-track album was recorded at Dub Narcotic Studios, Olympia and featured a line-up of Jon Spencer on guitar, vocals and organ, Judah Bauer on guitar, Russell Simins on drums, Jeff Smith on organ and Calvin Johnson on vocals and melodica (Talk About The Blues was also recorded during these sessions).

The Acme outtakes and remixes were issued as Acme + (UK), Xtra Acme USA (US) and Extra Acme (CD) / Ura Acme (LP) / Extra Acme (Promo Only LP) (Japan), all of which had slightly different track listings. Like Acme the album features different production, mixing, remixing credits and guest appearances including Steve Albini, Nick Sansano, Jack Dangers, David Holmes, Tim Goldsworthy, Calvin Johnson, Moby, Andre Williams, Jill Cunniff, Cody Dickinson, Luther Dickinson and Jim Dickinson.

The Shout Factory! / Shove Records 2010 expanded reissue of Acme included a 22-track version of Acme Plus as the second disc.

In February 2000 a 12" single, "Andre Williams Blues Explosion", featured remixes of the Andre Williams collaboration Lap Dance by Jim Waters/Scott Benzel and Jim Thirlwell.

Plastic Fang (2002–2003)
The album Plastic Fang was produced by Steve Jordan and recorded at Oorong, the Magic Shop and The Hit Factory. Released in April 2002, it featured art and design by Chip Kidd with the limited CD and vinyl editions being issued in a 'Fang Pack'. The original artwork for this album was culled from comics.

Various editions of this album featured different track listings but there were guest appearances by Dr. John, Elliott Smith, Bernie Worrell, Willie Weeks and Bashiri Johnson.

"She Said" was the first single taken from the album, this had a music video directed by Floria Sigismondi. On February 8, the group filmed a second live performance video at the 100 Club on Oxford Street, London for "She Said" (directed by Barney Clay). This single would be, to date, their highest UK single chart entry at number 58.

In April they appeared on the BBC TV show Later with Jools Holland featuring Jools playing piano during "Sweet n Sour".

The single "Sweet N Sour" came out in July with a video directed by Stylewar  it reached number 66 in the UK singles chart. Another single "Shakin' Rock'n'Roll Tonight" followed in November, reaching number 126.

On January 31, 2003 the band performed with Solomon Burke at Royal Festival Hall, London as "Solomon Burke Meets Jon Spencer Blues Explosion".

Damage (2004–2006)
Damage was the only album to be released on Sanctuary Records and for this release the band were temporarily known as just the Blues Explosion. The shortened name lasted less than two years.

The album was recorded between December 2003 and April 2004 at Empire View Studios, NYC, Globe Studios, NYC and Elegant Too Studios with production and mixing credits including Dan The Automator, DJ Shadow, Steve Jordan, Free Association (David Holmes), Jay Braun, Alan Moulder, Danny Madorsky, Chris Maxwell and Phil Hernandez (Elegant Too) as well as the Blues Explosion, Jon Spencer and Russell Simins.

During this time the band also recorded the Guitar Wolf cover version "Kawasaki ZII750 Rock 'N' Roll" at Empire View Recording Studio with Danny Madorsky for the tribute album I Love Guitar Wolf...Very Much. As a side note, the band Guitar Wolf once recorded an homage to the creator of the power chord, Mr. Link Wray.

Damage was released in September 2004 and features appearances from artists including Chuck D ("Hot Gossip"), Martina Topley-Bird ("Spoiled" / "You Been My Baby"), James Chance and DJ Shadow ("Fed Up and Low Down") and Simon Chardiet, who would later perform with the Heavy Trash live band ("Rattling").

The single "Burn It Off" was issued with music video directed by Stylewar. It number 77 in the charts.

In November, "Hot Gossip", the second single reached 119 in the official UK charts and had a music video directed by David Raccuglia. Issued as a red vinyl 7" only single featuring Elliott Smith on the B-side "Meet Me in the City" previously released on the tribute album Sunday Nights The Songs of Junior Kimbrough.

"Crunchy" was the third and final single released in April 2005, reaching number 89 in the UK charts.

The sleeves for all the Damage-era released featured photography by Ashkan Sahihi and design by Chip Kidd.

In Japan there were two slightly different promotional Radio Session CDs featuring live recordings of the album tracks "Help These Blues", "Spoiled", "Rattling", "Hot Gossip" and a cover of the Suicide song "Rocket USA", which is unavailable elsewhere.

In September (28/29) Russell Simins and Judah Bauer would join Tom Waits and Larry Taylor for a performance on the David Letterman TV show playing "Make It Rain" from the album Real Gone.

This particular event caused a furore behind the scenes when Mike Edison wrote a "crazed conspiracy rant" about Jon Spencer being replaced with Tom Waits for the Blues Explosion website . This was part of a bigger plan to get the a picture of Tom with Russell and Judah and send it out with a tongue-in-cheek press release ("Tom Waits Blues Explosion") to see if the story would get picked up by the mainstream press but before the event took place a record company publicist took the text direct from the Blues Explosion website and sent it out as a legitimate press release and very nearly led to the show being called off.

Between August 2004 and May 2005 the band toured Europe/the UK, the United States, Japan (eight dates with The Kills), Australia, the UK again (supporting The Hives) and Turkey.

At this time in the UK 'garage rock' and bands such as The Hives, The Strokes, White Stripes were popular and it was often noted that The Jon Spencer Blues Explosion never got the recognition many writers felt they deserved.

"It must rankle a little. Jon Spencer has been wrangling his brand of the blues – extrovert, down-and-dirty, pinched by punk and acknowledging a debt to Little Richard and Carl Perkins as much as Hasil Adkins and Son House – for around 14 years now. And have he and his band enjoyed even a taste of White Stripes-like acclaim? Have they flick"

Of Crunchy NME said it was "packing the kind of irresistible groove that would shoot straight to the number one for 14 years in any right-thinking world."

A mock-up newspaper (front page only) titled "The Daily Explosion" and DVD featuring the music videos for "Burn It Off" and "Hot Gossip" was available at US gigs in November 2004.

In 2005 an EP titled Snack Cracker was released in Japan. This compiled many of the UK single B-sides album with "Hot Gossip" and "Burn It Off" videos, a Jay Braun remix of "Hot Gossip" and a live recording of "Rattling" featuring Steve Jones of the Sex Pistols.

The Blues Explosion recorded the theme tune for Anthony Bourdain series No Reservations broadcast on The Travel Channel in 2005. The track lasts approximately 60 seconds and around 20 seconds of this is used during the programmes intro sequence and the menu screen on the subsequent DVD release.

On September 21, 2005 The Jon Spencer Blues Explosion appeared at Ko Ko, London performing as part of the "Don't Look Back" shows organised by ATP where artists played albums in their entirety. The band played Orange followed by a set of non-Orange songs.

During this time there was a message sent out to the Blues Explosion mailing list outlining a number of future projects and releases including news of a Live Recordings album recorded during the Damage tour (possibly just the Japanese shows) which has, to date, never been released.

Towards the end of 2005 the band went on hiatus and the members worked on numerous different projects with different artists.

Compilations and hiatus (2007–2011)
In October 2008 they released a compilation of rare and unreleased tracks including all tracks from the five Explosion Jukebox Series singles ("Shirt Jac", "Son of Sam", "Train No. 3", "Get with It" and "Ghetto Mom"). The album artwork parodied the original Back from the Grave 1983 compilation  with drawings of Judah, Russell and Jon replacing the original characters. Both sleeves were created by Mort Todd.

The band also started playing live again in June 2008 with a secret show at Bowery Electric followed by New York City Bicycle Film Festival and a short Jukebox Explosion European tour during August and September 2008.

In 2009 it was announced that The Jon Spencer Blues Explosion would release the 22 track retrospective compilation Dirty Shirt Rock 'n' Roll: The First Ten Years followed by expanded reissues of the previous albums Extra Width, Orange, Acme, Now I Got Worry, Controversial Negro and tracks from the early releases (the original Kramer and Steve Albini recordings) Year One.

On April 16, 2010 they played a one-off show at Brooklyn Bowl and announced more shows taking place from July 2010 including Pitchfork Music Festival, Chicago, the Matador @ 21 Festival at The Pearl, Las Vegas and a number of US and Canadian shows.

In an interview with "Get Back", Jon Spencer responded to a question about the possibility of the band releasing new material with "There's totally a chance. We've been playing concerts, touring and playing live because these records are coming out again. It's been very, very enjoyable. We have been talking about the possibility of something new."

The track "Bellbottoms" from the album Orange was featured at number 180 in a chart titled "The Top 200 Tracks of the 1990s" published by Pitchfork on August 30, 2010

In October Yahoo! Music interviewed Jon Spencer and the band performed acoustic versions of "Burn It Off", "Wail" and "Blues X Man". On October 15, 2010 videos of the songs and interview were published on the "Maximum Performance" blog along with a short article.

During 2010 the band started playing more regularly in Europe, US and Australia. They made their first UK appearance at London (Heaven) since the Don't Look Back performance of Orange at Koko in September 2005.

During the live shows the band played some previously unreleased songs including a cover of "My War" by Black Flag. And the band look set to continue playing live with further European live shows in mid-2011 including Primavera Festival in May.

Whilst touring in Australia, they recorded a cover version of "Black Betty" at Linear Recording for a commercial created by Volkswagen of America's agency Deutsch L.A. Inc. broadcast during Super Bowl Sunday on American television (February 6, 2011).

Meat + Bone (2012)
The band was chosen by Jeff Mangum of Neutral Milk Hotel to perform at the All Tomorrow's Parties festival that he curated in March 2012 in Minehead, England.

They released their new album Meat + Bone in September. It was very well received by the likes of Pitchfork, Mojo, The Quietus, The Independent on Sunday and The Observer.

Freedom Tower – No Wave Dance Party 2015 and split (2015−2018)
After extensive touring to promote Meat+Bone, the band returned to the studio in early 2015 to start work on their next album. The album, titled Freedom Tower - No Wave Dance Party 2015 was released on March 24, 2015. The band toured in support of the record, playing their final show in Nuremberg on March 18, 2016.

In a 2018 interview, Spencer confirmed that the Blues Explosion had split permanently, offering as an explanation:

"...everything got nipped in the bud when Judah [Bauer] got sick. He had developed a respiratory problem. He's doing better now, but he can't be going out on a rock and roll tour. Other things happened also. It wasn't just Judah's illness. For multiple reasons, it was, 'OK, this is probably over, this is done.'"

Other work / guest appearances

Judah Bauer
Judah Bauer was part of The Spitters "in their embryonic form" and has recorded or performed with Honeymoon Killers, Crowbar Massage, Twenty Miles aka: Bauer Brothers, Childballads (Stewart Lupton of Jonathan Fire*eater), Tom Waits, Speedball Baby and Cat Power & Dirty Delta Blues.

Under the name 20 Miles, Judah has released the following albums and EPs:

 Ragged Backyard Classics (In The Red, 1996)
 R.L. Boyce Othar Turner Fife & Drum Spam LP/CD (Fat Possum/Epitaph, 1997)
Sinful Tunes & Spirituals (Au Go-Go, 1998; split EP with Doo Rag)
 I'm a Lucky Guy (Fat Possum/Epitaph, 1998)
Let Every Town Furnish Its Own Women (Epitaph/Sony, 2000; split EP with Bob Log III)
 Keep It Coming (Fat Possum, 2002)
 Life Doesn't Rhyme (Fat Possum, 2003)

Russell Simins
Russell Simins has produced, remixed and performed with numerous bands including Yeah Yeah Yeahs, Honeymoon Killers, Crowbar Massage, Cibo Matto, Grapevine, Ween, Luscious Jackson, Yoko Ono, Money Mark, Fred Schneider, Duran Duran, Asian Dub Foundation, Stereolab, Tom Waits, The Pierces, Tandy, Spalding Rockwell, The Morning Pages, Little Barrie, Jena Malone, Tiny Masters of Today and Harper Simon. Russell Simins' song "I'm Not A Model" was also featured in the 2002 video game Jet Set Radio Future.

And as a core band member he has released the following albums:
Honeymoon Killers – Hung Far Low LP/CD (Fist Puppet, 1991)
Butter 08 (Grand Royal, 1996)
Crunt (Trance Syndicate, 1994)
Russell Simins – Public Places LP/CD (Grand Royal, 2000)
Men Without Pants (Victor, 2006)
Men Without Pants – Naturally (Expansion Team (US)/Vicious Circle (FR), 2009)

Jon Spencer

Jon Spencer has released some solo material in addition to being a core member of Shithaus, Pussy Galore, Boss Hog, Spencer Dickinson, Solex vs Cristina Martinez + Jon Spencer and in Heavy Trash with Matt Verta-Ray released the following albums:

Heavy Trash LP/CD (Yep Roc (US)/Crunchy Frog (DK)/Victor/JVC (JP), 2005)
Heavy Trash – Going Way Out With Heavy Trash LP/CD (Yep Roc (US)/Crunchy Frog (DK)/Victor/JVC (JP), 2007)
Heavy Trash – Mightnight Soul Serenade LP/CD (Big Legal Mess (US)/Crunchy Frog (DK)/Bronzerat (UK), 2009)

With the Honeymoon Killers he appears on several recordings and made one complete album as a member of the band with Russell Simins, Jerry Teel and Lisa Wells:

Honeymoon Killers – Hung Far Low LP/CD (Fist Puppet, 1991)

He has also performed with, recorded, remixed and produced a huge number of artists including: Gibson Bros., Workdogs, Nancy Sinatra, Moby, Cheater Slicks, Beck, Demolition Doll Rods, Edison Rocket Train/Mike Edison, Einstürzende Neubauten, Coldcut, Powersolo, Puffy AmiYumi, Eros Ramazzotti, The Sadies, Add N to (X), Rob K, Haze XXL, Lost Crusaders, David Holmes, Khan, Los Straitjackets, Bomb the Bass, Princess Superstar, Speedball Baby, Five Dollar Priest, The King Brothers, The Tremolo Beer Gut, Bikini Machine, Phenomenal Handclap Band, The Micragirls, Cobra Killer, The Japanese Popstars, The Slew and Perrosky.

Discography

Studio albums

Other albums and EPs

Singles

Music videos

References

External links
 Jon Spencer Blues Explosion at Matador Records
 Jon Spencer Blues Explosion – Discography/Website: Pop-Catastrophe.co.uk
 "The Spencer Report", a complete list of songs and releases these appear on, 1991–95.

Matador Records artists
Alternative rock groups from New York (state)
American blues rock musical groups
Garage rock groups from New York (state)
Indie rock musical groups from New York (state)
Musical groups established in 1990
Mute Records artists
Punk blues musical groups
In the Red artists
Mom + Pop Music artists
Au Go Go Records artists
Sanctuary Records artists